Quỳ Châu is a rural district of Nghệ An province in the North Central Coast region of Vietnam. As of 2003 the district had a population of 52,403. The district covers an area of 1,074 km². The district capital lies at Tân Lạc Town.

A 200-page book in an ancient Tai script was discovered in Mường Dan Village in February 2007.

Subdivisions
Quỳ Châu has one town and 11 townships or communes (xã).
Tân Lạc (formerly named Quỳ Châu)
Châu Bính
Châu Thuận
Châu Hội
Châu Nga
Châu Tiến
Châu Hạnh
Châu Thắng
Châu Phong
Châu Bình
Châu Hoàn
Diễn Lâm

References

Further reading
Hum-phân-Lattanavông. 1998. Quỳ Châu script (in Vietnamese). Văn hóa và lịch sử người Thái ở Việt Nam [Culture and history of the Thai people of Vietnam], ed. by Cãm Trong, Hoàng LùÒng, Lê Si Giáo, VùÒng Toàn, Ma Khánh BAng and Nguyèn Van Hòa, Hà Nội, Việt Nam: Nhà Xuất Bản Văn Hóa Dân Tộc.
Lattanavong, H. 1999. "Quy Chau script of the Lao-Tay: a change from Chinese ideograms to the Indian system of writing", in Vietnamese Studies, no. 134.
Thang, L.C. 1999. "A glimpse of the Thai in Quy Chau", in Vietnamese Studies, no. 134.

Districts of Nghệ An province